Since the rebranding of the European Champion Clubs' Cup as the UEFA Champions League in 1992, 92 players from 37 countries have scored three goals (a hat-trick) or more in a single match on 146 occasions, representing 51 clubs from 17 leagues. The first player to achieve the feat was Juul Ellerman, who scored three times for PSV Eindhoven in a 6–0 victory over Žalgiris on 16 September 1992. Lionel Messi and Cristiano Ronaldo have scored three or more goals in a match eight times each in the Champions League, more than any other player, followed by Robert Lewandowski with six, and Karim Benzema with four.

Only Lewandowski has scored a hat-trick for three clubs (Borussia Dortmund, Bayern Munich and Barcelona), with a further 12 players having scored hat-tricks for two clubs: Filippo Inzaghi (Juventus and Milan), Michael Owen (Liverpool and Manchester United), Samuel Eto'o (Barcelona and Inter Milan), Marco Simone (Milan and Monaco), Ruud van Nistelrooy (PSV and Manchester United), Roy Makaay (Deportivo La Coruña and Bayern), Andriy Shevchenko (Dynamo Kyiv and Milan), Didier Drogba (Marseille and Chelsea), Neymar (Barcelona and Paris Saint-Germain), Ronaldo (Real Madrid and Juventus), Olivier Giroud (Arsenal and Chelsea) and Erling Haaland (Borussia Dortmund and Manchester City).

Seventeen players have scored four or more goals in a match; of these, only Messi and Lewandowski have achieved this more than once. Only Messi (on 8 March 2012 against Bayer Leverkusen), Luiz Adriano (on 21 October 2014 against BATE Borisov) and Haaland (on 14 March 2023 against Leipzig) have scored five goals in a match. The other thirteen players to score four goals in a game are van Basten, Simone Inzaghi, Dado Pršo, van Nistelrooy, Shevchenko, Bafétimbi Gomis, Mario Gómez, Zlatan Ibrahimović, Ronaldo, Serge Gnabry, Josip Iličić, Giroud and Sébastien Haller. Only Ronaldo (four times), Messi, Lewandowski and Benzema (twice each) have scored multiple hat-tricks in the knockout stage. 

Ten players have scored a hat-trick on their competition debut: Marco van Basten, Faustino Asprilla, Yakubu, Wayne Rooney, Vincenzo Iaquinta, Grafite, Yacine Brahimi, Haaland, Mislav Oršić, and Haller; of those, only van Basten and Haller have scored four goals. Seven players have scored hat-tricks in consecutive seasons: Adriano (2004–05 and 2005–06), Gómez (2010–11 and 2011–12), Roberto Soldado (2011–12 and 2012–13), Ronaldo (2012–13 and 2013–14, and 2015–16 and 2016–17), Messi (2013–14 and 2014–15), Gabriel Jesus (2018–19 and 2019–20), and Kylian Mbappé (2019–20 and 2020–21). Three players have scored hat-tricks in back-to-back games; Ronaldo for Real against Bayern on 18 April and Atlético Madrid on 2 May 2017, the shortest gap between hat-tricks at just 14 days. Luiz Adriano accomplished this feat for Shakhtar Donetsk on 21 October and 5 November 2014, with both hat-tricks coming against BATE Borisov in a span of 15 days. Benzema scored a hat-trick for Real against PSG on 9 March 2022, and against Chelsea on 6 April. Ronaldo is the only player to score three hat-tricks in the same season, doing so during the 2015–16 season. Four other players have scored multiple hat-tricks in the same season: Messi for Barcelona in both 2011–12, and again in 2016–17, Gómez for Bayern, also in 2011–12, Lewandowski scored two hat-tricks for Bayern in 2021–22, and Benzema did so for Real in the same season.

Mohamed Salah holds the record for the quickest hat-trick, netting three times for Liverpool against Rangers in 6 minutes and 12 seconds on 12 October 2022. Only six players have scored a hat-trick after coming on as a substitute: Uwe Rösler (Kaiserslautern), Joseba Llorente (Villarreal), Walter Pandiani (Deportivo), Mbappé (PSG), Marcus Rashford (Manchester United), and Salah. The youngest scorer of a hat-trick was Raúl, who scored a hat-trick for Real against Ferencváros, aged 18 years and 114 days, on 18 October 1995. Rooney is the youngest debut scorer of a hat-trick, aged 18 years and 340 days, when he scored for Manchester United against Fenerbahçe on 28 September 2004. The oldest scorer of a hat-trick is Benzema, who was 34 years and 108 days old when he scored three against Chelsea on 6 April 2022. The longest spell between two hat-tricks was achieved by Owen, who scored his first hat-trick on 22 October 2002 for Liverpool and his second over seven years later on 8 December 2009 for United.

Ten hat-tricks were scored in the 2019–20 season, the most of any season in Champions League history.

Hat-tricks

"Result" column shows the player's team's score first

Multiple hat-tricks
The following table lists the number of hat-tricks scored by players who have scored two or more hat-tricks. Bold indicates a player who is currently active.

See also
UEFA Champions League
List of UEFA Champions League top scorers
European Cup and UEFA Champions League records and statistics

References

Hat-tricks
UEFA Champions League